LiveVideo was a social network launched in 2006 backed by MySpace founder, Brad Greenspan. It offered one of the first user generated video hosting platforms integrated with social media features described as a mashup of MySpace and YouTube, and later an interactive live video streaming platform.

History 
LiveVideo was founded in 2006 but launched officially in 2008, with an interactive interview with Steve Nash of the Phoenix Suns, called Drive Home with Steve Nash.

LiveVideo.com struggled to take advantage of its early leadership in the live video sector as a result of a lack of financial resources an issue accelerating in 2008 after Brad Greenspan,  the CEO acquired Revver.com a money losing video hosting website located in Los Angeles.

As of September 22, 2022, the LiveVideo.com domain forwards to a Coming Soon 2022 page with a  LiveVideo.com logo.

Reception
LiveVideo received media coverage with its official launch in 2008 and after partnering with William Shatner to star in video series ShatnerVision. Later LiveVideo created a controversy by successfully recruiting Smosh  “YouTube’s biggest stars” in 2007 to create videos.

See also 
 LivePlace
 Brad Greenspan
 Myspace

References 

Social networking websites
Online algorithms